is the eighth single from singer Maaya Sakamoto and was released on August 23, 2000.  The song was used as the opening theme for the game Napple Tale.

Track listing

{Note: The opening theme in Napple Tale}

{Note: A sequence theme in Napple Tale}

{Note: Made for Napple Tale, but never used}

Charts

References

External links
 

2000 singles
Maaya Sakamoto songs
2000 songs
Victor Entertainment singles